Madison Cox (born 24 October 1995) is a Puerto Rican footballer who plays as a defender for Tampa Bay United in the USL W League, the Tampa Bay Strikers in the National Indoor Soccer League, and the Puerto Rico women's national team.

Club career

Tampa Bay United
In 2018, Cox joined Women's Premier Soccer League side Tampa Bay United.

Tampa Bay Strikers 
In August 2022, Cox signed with the Tampa Bay Strikers of the National Indoor Soccer League.

International career

In June 2021, Cox accepted a call-up to the Puerto Rican women's national football team. On 12 June, she made her debut in a 5–1 friendly loss to Uruguay. In October 2021, Cox scored her first goal for Puerto Rico in a 6–1 friendly victory over Guyana, netting in the 47th minute.

International goals
 Scores and results list Puerto Rico's goal tally first, score column indicates score after each Cox goal.

References

1995 births
Living people
Women's association football defenders
American women's soccer players
Puerto Rican women's footballers
Puerto Rico women's international footballers
Soccer players from Tampa, Florida
People from Hillsborough County, Florida
Grand Canyon Antelopes women's soccer players
Indoor soccer players
Tampa Spartans soccer
College women's track and field athletes in the United States